Samuel Gosnell Green (20 December 1822 – 15 September 1905) was an English Baptist minister, educator, author, and bibliophile.

Born in Falmouth, Cornwall, Green was the eldest son among the nine children of a Baptist minister and was sent to a private school in Camberwell. After leaving school, he worked in the printing office of John Haddon in Finsbury and then as a tutor until the age of nineteen. He matriculated in 1840 at the Baptist College, Stepney to prepare for the Baptist ministry and graduated in 1843 with a B.A. from the University of London.

Green was the editorial secretary of the Religious Tract Society until 1891. In 1900 the University of St Andrews bestowed upon him the honorary degree of D.D. He was the author of eighteen books.

He married in 1848. His wife died in May 1905 shortly before he died in September 1905 in Streatham. There were three sons and a daughter from the marriage.

Selected publications
 
 
 
  Revised and improved edition, 1886
 
 with illustrations by English and foreign artists: 
 with illustrations by Samuel Manning:  
  (Welsh translation, 1882)
 
 
 
 
 
 with Joseph Angus:

References

External links

1822 births
1905 deaths
19th-century English Baptist ministers
Alumni of the University of London
English religious writers